Nims House may refer to:

In the United States

Michigan
William Reuben Nims House, Lexington
Rudolph Nims House, Monroe